"Money" is the a song by British R&B singer Jamelia, released as the second single from her debut album, Drama (2000), on 21 February 2000. Originally, "Thinking 'Bout You" was to be the second single from the album; a video was filmed and promotional copies of the single were sent to radio stations across the UK. That single was cancelled and the video was never released to the public. "Money" was chosen to replace "Thinking 'Bout You" as the second single from Drama.

"Money" is considered by many to be Jamelia's breakthrough hit as the song made the UK top five upon its release, spending 11 weeks inside the UK top 100. The song features reggae star Beenie Man and was co-written by former The X Factor finalist Daniel de Bourg.

Track listings
All tracks feature Beenie Man.

UK CD single
 "Money" (radio edit)
 "Money" (Old Skool mix)
 "Money" (Smokin Beats mix – edit)
 "Money" (Capital T club mix – edit)
 "Money" (Emmanuel remix)
 "Money" (enhanced section – video)

UK 12-inch single
A1. "Money" (radio edit)
A2. "Money" (Old Skool mix)
A3. "Money" (Poisonous Crew mix)
B1. "Money" (Smokin Beats club mix – edit)
B2. "Money" (Capital T club mix – edit)

UK cassette single
A1. "Money" (radio edit)
A2. "Money" (Old Skool mix)
B1. "Money" (Smokin Beats club mix)

European CD single
 "Money" (radio edit)
 "Money" (Emmanuel instrumental)

European maxi-CD single
 "Money" (radio edit)
 "Money" (Emmanuel remix)
 "Money" (Smokin Beats mix – edit)
 "Money" (Capital T club mix – edit)
 "Money" (enhanced section – video)

Charts

References

1999 songs
2000 singles
Jamelia songs
Beenie Man songs
Songs written by Colin Emmanuel
Songs written by Daniel de Bourg
Songs written by Jamelia